Báidì ( "White Emperor" or "White Deity") or Báishén ( "White God"), also known as the Xīdì ( "West Deity") or Xīyuèdàdì ( "Great Deity of the Western Peak") is one of the five manifestations of the deity Shangdi. He is associated with metal, the east, and autumn. As a human he was Shǎohào, and he is the manifestation of the supreme God associated with the essence of metal and autumn. His animal form is the White Dragon ( Báilóng) and his stellar animal is the tiger. His astral body is Venus.

Taibai Jinxing is his son.

Uprising of the White Serpent 
According to the legend of the "Uprising of the Slaying of the White Serpent", Liu's ascension to rulership was prophesied after becoming an outlaw. In the legend, a gigantic white serpent killed some of the outlaws with its poisonous breath; the serpent was killed by a drunk Liu during the night. The next morning, the outlaws encountered an old woman along the road; when asked why she was crying she mysteriously disappeared after replying: "My child, the White Emperor's son, has been slain by the son of the Red Emperor." Liu's reputation grew among his followers, who became convinced of his destiny.

Xiyue Dadi

Xiyue Dadi  ( "Great Deity of the Western Peak") is the god of Mount Hua and one of the Great Emperor of Five Mountains, identified with Baidi. The belief of Emperor Xiyue originated from the worship of mountains and rivers in ancient China. Among the five great mountains, Mount Hua has long been respected for its proximity to Chang'an, the capital of Han and Tang Dynasties. Emperor Wudi built the first worship temple of him at foot of the Mount Hua, he named the temple Jilinggong Palace later changed to Xiyue Temple. Xiyue Dadi is the father of Huayue Sanniang and Huashan Sanlang.

In the Li Shi (隶释) Volume 2 Fan Yixiu Huayue Stele contains: "It is said that the Xiyue, the worship of the three males, can rejuvenate the clouds and rain, produce all things, and master the essence, which is beneficial to people." 

Chinese gods

See also 
 Shaohao
 Wufang Shangdi
 Three Sovereigns and Five Emperors
 Baidicheng
 Gongsun Shu
 Zhao Gongming

References 

Characters in Chinese mythology 
Wufang Shangdi
Chinese deities